This name uses Portuguese naming customs. the first or maternal family name is Duarte and the second or paternal family name is 

de Barros.
Rui Duarte de Barros (born 18 February 1960, Cadique, Tombali Region) is a Bissau-Guinean politician who was the Transitional Prime Minister of Guinea-Bissau from 16 May  2012 to 3 July 2014.

References

Living people
Prime Ministers of Guinea-Bissau
Finance ministers of Guinea-Bissau
1960 births
People from Tombali Region